Awake and Remixed EP is the third EP by American Christian rock band Skillet. All songs are remixed versions from their previous album, Awake. It was released on March 22, 2011 and debuted at No. 98 on the Billboard 200.

Track listing

Reception

The remix album received mixed reviews from critics, with many citing that only half of the album was enjoyable.

Credits 

 John L. Cooper – vocals, bass guitar
 Korey Cooper – keyboards, guitar, vocals
 Jen Ledger – drums, vocals
 Ben Kasica – guitar
 Jonathan Chu – violin
 Tate Olsen – cello

Charts

References

2011 EPs
Skillet (band) albums
Atlantic Records EPs